Jether is a name mentioned several times in the Hebrew Bible. It means "surplus" or "excellence".

The father-in-law of Moses (Exodus 4:18 marg.), called elsewhere Jethro or Jothor.
The oldest of Gideon's seventy sons, who was asked to kill the Midianite kings Zebah and Zalmunna who had been captured by Gideon. Being still young at the time, he did not have the confidence to carry out his father's request, so Zebah and Zalmunna called on Gideon to perform the deed himself.
The father of Amasa, David's general (1 Kings 2:5, 32); called Ithra (2 Sam. 17:25).
1 Chr. 7:38.
1 Chr. 2:32; one of Judah's posterity.
1 Chr. 4:17.

References

Book of Exodus people
Book of Judges people
Books of Kings people
Books of Samuel people
Books of Chronicles people